Billups  may refer to:

Places
 Billups Branch, a stream in the U.S. states of Iowa and Missouri
 Billups House, located near Moon, Mathews County, Virginia
 Billups, Mississippi, a village in Lowndes County, Mississippi

People
Chauncey Billups (born 1976), American basketball player and coach
Jalen Billups (born 1992), American international basketball player
Pope B. Billups (1889–1955), American lawyer and politician
Rodney Billups (born 1983), American basketball coach
Tom Billups (born 1964), American rugby union player and coach